Terebratellidae is an extant family of brachiopods with a fossil record dating back to the Jurassic.

References 

Terebratulida
Brachiopod families
Prehistoric protostome families
Mesozoic brachiopods
Brachiopods of Europe
Brachiopods of Oceania
Brachiopods of South America
Extinct animals of Antarctica
Jurassic first appearances
Pleistocene extinctions